Forrest "Woody" Hunt (December 3, 1966 – December 21, 2002) was an American professional tennis player.

Hunt grew up in Southern California, attending South Torrance High School. He was runner-up to Jay Berger at the 1985 USTA 18s national championships and achieved a national ranking that year of fifth for his age group.

A three-time All-American at UC Berkeley, Hunt competed briefly on the professional tour and attained a best world ranking of 434. He featured in three singles main draws on the Grand Prix tennis circuit and registered two match wins, over Peter Fleming at the 1987 Transamerica Open and Éric Winogradsky at the 1989 Cincinnati Open. In 1991 he was picked as a practice player on the United States Davis Cup team for a tie against Spain in Newport, Rhode Island.

Personal life
Hunt was seriously injured in a car accident in 1996 which left him with paralysis in his right arm. He also suffered with biopolar disorder and in 2002 committed suicide aged 36. 

A USTA junior tennis tournament has been named in his honor.

References

External links
 
 

1966 births
2002 deaths
American male tennis players
Tennis people from California
Sportspeople from Torrance, California
California Golden Bears men's tennis players
Suicides in California